See also Marjorie Bruce, her granddaughter.

Marjorie of Carrick (also called Margaret; died before 9 November 1292) was Countess of Carrick, Scotland, from 1256 to 1292, and is notable as the mother of Robert the Bruce.

Family
Marjorie was the daughter and heiress of Niall Mac Dhonnchad, 2nd Earl of Carrick and his wife Margaret Stewart.  Her mother's father was Walter Stewart, 3rd High Steward of Scotland. Her father Niall was the head of their clan, having no sons, in 1255 he transferred the title of clan chieftain to his nephew Roland, and upon Niall's death in 1256, Marjorie succeeded him to become the 3rd Countess of Carrick in her own right. Marjorie married Adam of Kilconquhar, who died during the Eighth Crusade in 1271. Marjorie and Adam had one child before his death, Martha.
Then, as the story goes, a handsome young man arrived one day to tell her of her husband's death in the Holy Land. He was Robert de Brus, 6th Lord of Annandale, and he had been a companion-in-arms of Adam of Kilconquhar. Marjorie was so taken with him that she had him held captive until he agreed to marry her at Turnberry Castle in 1271. They married without permission of the king, however, and as a result she lost her lands temporarily until they paid a large fine. Robert became Earl of Carrick jure uxoris (in right of his wife). Their children were:
 Isabel Bruce (1272–1358), married King Eric II of Norway.
 Christina Bruce
 Robert the Bruce.
 Niall or Nigel Bruce, executed 1306 in Berwick-upon-Tweed, Northumberland, England.
 Edward Bruce.
 Sir Thomas Bruce, executed 1307.
 Alexander Bruce, executed 1307.
 Mary Bruce, married
 Sir Niall Campbell
 Sir Alexander Fraser of Touchfraser and Cowie.
 Matilda Bruce, married Hugh, Earl of Ross
 Elizabeth Bruce, married William Dishington
 Margaret Bruce, married William Carlyle

Margaret Bruce who married Sir William de Carlyle is thought by Barrow not to be their daughter. 
It is speculated that Thomas Randolph, 1st Earl of Moray was the son of Marjorie's daughter, Martha, from her first marriage with Adam. It is put forward as an explanation of why Thomas Randolph was described as a nephew of Robert the Bruce. There is evidence that an "eldest daughter" married into the family of the earls of Mar, giving rise to the now discounted first marriage of Christina to the son of the earl, Gartnait.

Marjorie died before November 1292, at which time her husband transferred Carrick to their eldest son, Robert.

References

Sources
Scott, Ronald McNair. Robert the Bruce: King of Scots

Marjorie, Countess of Carrick
People from Dumfries and Galloway
Marjorie, Countess of Carrick
13th-century Scottish women
13th-century mormaers
1256 births
1292 deaths
Marjorie